Pocket Creek is a stream in Floyd County, in the U.S. state of Georgia.

Pocket Creek was so named from a bend, or "pocket", in the river valley. The stream was formed from springs inside this valley.

See also
List of rivers of Georgia (U.S. state)
Lake Marvin
The Pocket (Floyd County, Georgia)

References

Rivers of Floyd County, Georgia
Rivers of Georgia (U.S. state)